The Loud House is an American animated television series created by Chris Savino that premiered on Nickelodeon on May 2, 2016. The series focuses on Lincoln Loud, the middle and only male child in a house full of girls, who is often breaking the fourth wall to explain to viewers the chaotic conditions and sibling relationships of the household.

Series overview

Episodes

Season 1 (2016)
Every episode and segment of this season was directed by Chris Savino, with him co-directing with Kyle Marshall in the episode "The Price of Admission"/"One Flu Over the Loud House" (#125).

Season 2 (2016–17)
All episodes and segments of this season were produced by Karen Malach, and most were directed by Chris Savino, with him co-directing with Kyle Marshall on the episodes "The Old and the Restless" (#202B), "Vantastic Voyage" (#205B), and "Patching Things Up" (#206A). The only episodes in this season Chris didn't direct were "Frog Wild" (#208B), "Pulp Friction" (#211A), "Room with a Feud" (#214B), "Garage Banned" (#217B), "Change of Heart" (#218A), "Friend or Faux?" (#220B), "Mall of Duty" (#222B), "The Crying Dame" (#225A), and "Snow Way Out" (#226B), all were directed by Kyle Marshall.

Season 3 (2018–19)

Season 4 (2019–20)

Special (2020)

Season 5 (2020–22)

Specials (2021–22)

Season 6 (2022)

Films (2021)

Shorts (2014–22)

Notes

References

Loud House
Loud House
Loud House
Episodes